Dorimcheon is a station on the Sinjeong Branch of the Seoul Subway Line 2. It is the least-used station on Line 2. This station is located in Sindorim-dong, Guro-gu, Seoul.

Vicinity
Exit 1 : Sindorim Elementary School
Exit 2 : Anyang River

References

Railway stations opened in 1992
Seoul Metropolitan Subway stations
Metro stations in Guro District, Seoul
1992 establishments in South Korea
20th-century architecture in South Korea